The Infiniti Emerg-E is a concept sports car developed by the Infiniti division of Nissan Motors and unveiled to the public at the 2012 Geneva Motor Show.

It is based on the Lotus Evora platform and the hybrid powertrain shown in 2012 as the Lotus 414E concept car. The Emerg-E has a  electric-only range, after which an onboard  three-cylinder  petrol engine recharges the lithium-ion battery pack. The car can also be plugged in to recharge.

The mid-engined two-seater sports car may not reach production, but was shown as a working prototype at the 2012 Goodwood Festival of Speed.

Project backers

The project was part-funded by the British government sponsored Technology Strategy Board, and involved Nissan UK's Cranfield technical centre and other British suppliers including Lola, Batteries by Castlet Ltd (Formally Amberjac Projects) and Xtrac transmissions.

See also
 Nissan Esflow

References

Emerg-e
Plug-in hybrid vehicles
Hybrid electric cars
Sports cars
Coupés